State Superintendent of Education is an elected office of a constitutional nature in some U.S. states and may refer to:

California State Superintendent of Public Instruction
North Carolina Superintendent of Public Instruction
Oklahoma Superintendent of Public Instruction
Oregon Superintendent of Public Instruction
Texas Commissioner of Education
Washington State Superintendent of Public Instruction
Wisconsin Superintendent of Public Instruction

State superintendents of public instruction of the United States